Absolute Radio 20s is a spin-off UK-based radio station from Absolute Radio. It launched at 10.00am on 24 February 2020 and operates solely online. It is the seventh decades themed station to be launched by Absolute's owner, Bauer Radio. Presenters include Danielle Perry and Ross Buchanan.

The first song to be played on the station was "Instant History" by Biffy Clyro.

The station plays rock and alternative music from both emerging and established artists and groups and has the strapline of "new music matters."

References

External links

Absolute Radio
Radio stations established in 2020
2020 establishments in the United Kingdom
Bauer Radio